George E. Scott (July 3, 1860 – November 9, 1915) was a member of the Wisconsin State Assembly and the Wisconsin State Senate.

Biography
Scott was born on July 3, 1860, in Durand, Wisconsin. He died at his home in Prairie Farm, Wisconsin, on November 9, 1915.

Career
Scott was elected to the Assembly in 1904 and was re-elected in 1906 and 1908. Later, he was elected to the Senate in 1910 and re-elected in 1914. He was a Republican.

References

People from Durand, Wisconsin
People from Barron County, Wisconsin
Republican Party Wisconsin state senators
Republican Party members of the Wisconsin State Assembly
1860 births
1915 deaths
19th-century American politicians